Daniel Arthur Stumpf (born January 4, 1991) is an American former professional baseball pitcher. He has played in Major League Baseball (MLB) for the Philadelphia Phillies and Detroit Tigers.

Career
Stumpf played college baseball at San Jacinto College. He was drafted by the Kansas City Royals in the 9th round of the 2012 Major League Baseball Draft.

Philadelphia Phillies

2016

Stumpf was selected by the Philadelphia Phillies in the 2015 Rule 5 draft. Stumpf made the Phillies' 2016 Opening Day roster, and debuted in the major leagues on April 7. On April 14, 2016, Stumpf received an 80-game suspension from Major League Baseball for testing positive for having used the performance enhancing drug dehydrochlormethyltestosterone. He was designated for assignment by the Phillies on July 22. He was returned to the Royals three days later.

Detroit Tigers

2017
On December 8, 2016, Stumpf was selected by the Detroit Tigers in the 2016 Rule 5 draft. Because Stumpf had been selected in the Rule 5 draft and returned to the Royals once before, he was able to elect free agency after the Tigers placed him on waivers and he went unclaimed. 

On April 1, 2017, Stumpf signed a Major League contract with the Tigers and was added to the 40 man roster. On June 2, 2017, Stumpf was recalled by the Detroit Tigers. Prior to being recalled, he posted a 1–2 record, with a 3.38 ERA and 26 strikeouts in 21 innings for the Triple-A Toledo Mud Hens. He made his Tiger debut in a June 3 game against the Chicago White Sox, allowing one hit and striking out one batter. Stumpf pitched  innings for the 2017 Tigers, striking out 33 and posting a 3.82 ERA.

2018
Stumpf began the 2018 season in the Tigers bullpen. He earned his first Major League win with a perfect  innings of relief in a victory over the Pittsburgh Pirates on April 25. In  relief innings over the 2018 season, Stumpf pitched to a 4.93 ERA with 37 strikeouts.

2019
Stumpf began the 2019 season in the Tigers bullpen. He was optioned to AAA Toledo on July 24 to make room for the recall of Drew VerHagen. Stumpf returned to the Tigers as a September call-up. He was used as a lefty specialist throughout the season, only pitching 29 innings in 48 games. Stumpf was outrighted off the Tigers roster and elected free agency on October 24, 2019.

Pitching coach controversy
On June 27, 2018, Tigers pitching coach Chris Bosio was fired due to racially insensitive comments. Bosio claims that the offending comment was referring to Stumpf as "Spider Monkey" due to the faces he makes while lifting weights, which was overheard by an African American clubhouse attendant. However, Stumpf says that, to the best of his knowledge, his nickname was never "Spider Monkey".

See also
Rule 5 draft results
List of Major League Baseball players suspended for performance-enhancing drugs

References

External links

1991 births
American sportspeople in doping cases
Baseball players from Texas
Burlington Royals players
Cangrejeros de Santurce (baseball) players
Clearwater Threshers players
Detroit Tigers players
Lehigh Valley IronPigs players
Lexington Legends players
Liga de Béisbol Profesional Roberto Clemente pitchers
Living people
Major League Baseball pitchers
Major League Baseball players suspended for drug offenses
Northwest Arkansas Naturals players
People from Humble, Texas
Peoria Javelinas players
Philadelphia Phillies players
Reading Fightin Phils players
San Jacinto North Gators baseball players
Toledo Mud Hens players
Wilmington Blue Rocks players